Louise Lamphere (born 1940) is an American anthropologist who has been distinguished professor of anthropology at the University of New Mexico since 2001. She was a faculty member at UNM from 1976–1979 and again from 1986–2009, when she became a professor emerita.

Lamphere served as president of the American Anthropological Association from 1999 to 2001.

Career 
Lamphere received her B.A. and M.A. from Stanford University in 1962 and 1966 and her Ph.D. from Harvard University in 1968. She has published extensively throughout her career on subjects as diverse as the Navajo and their medicinal practices and de-industrialisation and urban anthropology; nonetheless she is possibly best known for her work on feminist anthropology and gender issues.

In 1977, Lamphere became an associate of the Women's Institute for Freedom of the Press (WIFP).

Lamphere was the co-editor, with Michelle Zimbalist Rosaldo, of Woman, Culture, and Society, the first volume to address the anthropological study of gender and women's status. 

In the 1970s, after being denied tenure at Brown University, Lamphere brought a class action suit against Brown for gender discrimination. She won an out-of-court settlement that served as a model for future suits by others. In 2015, Brown announced a series of events (including a symposium) examining the important impact of the suit and its settlement.

In 2005 Lamphere supervised an ethnographic team which examined the impact of Medicaid managed care in New Mexico. The team published their articles in a special issue of Medical Anthropology Quarterly. In her introduction, she emphasized the impact of increased bureaucratization on women workers in health care clinics, emergency rooms and small doctors offices.

Lamphere was elected as the member of the School for Advanced Research on August 5, 2017.

Awards 
In 2013, she was awarded the Franz Boas Award for Exemplary Service to Anthropology from the American Anthropological Association.

On May 24, 2015 Brown University awarded Lamphere an honorary doctorate (honoris causa) for her "courage in standing up for equity and fairness for all faculty and [her] exemplary examinations of urban anthropology, healthcare practices and gender issues."

In 2017, she was awarded the Bronislaw Malinowski Award by The Society of Applied Anthropology.

Selected works
 Sunbelt Working Mothers: Reconciling Family and Factory. Co-authored with Patricia Zavella, Felipe Gonzales and Peter B. Evans. Ithaca: Cornell University Press. 1993
 Newcomers in the Workplace: Immigrants and the Restructuring of the U.S. Economy, co-edited with Guillermo Grenier. Philadelphia: Temple University Press. 1994.
 Situated Lives: Gender and Culture in Everyday Life (edited with Helena Ragone' and Patricia Zavella) New York: Routledge Press. 1997.
 "Gender Models in the Southwest: Sociocultural Perspectives" in Women & Men in the Prehispanic Southwest, edited by Patricia L. Crown. Santa Fe: School of American Research Press. pp. 379–402. 2001.
 "Rereading and Remembering Michelle Rosaldo" in Gender Matters: Rereading Michelle Z. Rosaldo. ed. by Alejandro Lugo and Bill Maurer. Ann Arbor: The University of Michigan Press. pp. 1–15. 2001
 "Perils and Prospects for an Engaged Anthropology: A view from the U.S." (2002 Plenary address of the meetings of the European Association of Social Anthropology. Social Anthropology 11(2): 13–28. 2003.
 "Women, Culture, and Society". Co-edited with Michelle Zimbalist Rosaldo. Stanford, CA: Stanford University Press. 1974.
 "Unofficial Histories: A Vision of Anthropology From the Margins." 2001 American Anthropological Association Presidential Address. American Anthropologist 106(1). 2004.

References

External links
 Louise Lamphere Papers --Pembroke Center Archives, Brown University
 Professor Louise Lamphere's Curriculum Vitae Accessed from University of New Mexico webpage 8 June 2008 
 Profile of Work as American Anthropological Association "Squeaky Wheel" Award Recipient 1998 Accessed 8 June 2008 

American anthropologists
Women anthropologists
Stanford University alumni
Harvard University alumni
1941 births
Living people
Brown University faculty
University of New Mexico faculty